Elections to Strabane District Council were held on 17 May 1989 on the same day as the other Northern Irish local government elections. The election used three district electoral areas to elect a total of 15 councillors.

Election results

Note: "Votes" are the first preference votes.

Districts summary

|- class="unsortable" align="centre"
!rowspan=2 align="left"|Ward
! % 
!Cllrs
! % 
!Cllrs
! %
!Cllrs
! %
!Cllrs
! % 
!Cllrs
! % 
!Cllrs
!rowspan=2|TotalCllrs
|- class="unsortable" align="center"
!colspan=2 bgcolor="" | UUP
!colspan=2 bgcolor="" | DUP
!colspan=2 bgcolor="" | SDLP
!colspan=2 bgcolor="" | Sinn Féin
!colspan=2 bgcolor="" | Alliance
!colspan=2 bgcolor="white"| Others
|-
|align="left"|Derg
|19.0
|1
|bgcolor="#D46A4C"|25.2
|bgcolor="#D46A4C"|1
|10.6
|1
|21.1
|1
|1.1
|0
|23.0
|1
|5
|-
|align="left"|Glenelly
|26.5
|1
|bgcolor="#D46A4C"|36.2
|bgcolor="#D46A4C"|2
|24.6
|1
|10.2
|0
|2.5
|1
|0.0
|0
|5
|-
|align="left"|Mourne
|16.2
|1
|0.0
|0
|18.9
|1
|30.6
|1
|0.0
|0
|bgcolor="#CDFFAB"|34.3
|bgcolor="#CDFFAB"|2
|5
|-
|- class="unsortable" class="sortbottom" style="background:#C9C9C9"
|align="left"| Total
|20.3
|3
|19.7
|3
|17.9
|3
|21.1
|2
|1.1
|1
|19.9
|2
|15
|-
|}

District results

Derg

1985: 2 x DUP, 1 x Sinn Féin, 1 x UUP, 1 x Independent Nationalist
1989: 1 x DUP, 1 x Sinn Féin, 1 x UUP, 1 x SDLP, 1 x Independent Unionist
1985-1989 Change: SDLP and Independent Unionist gain from DUP and Independent Nationalist

Glenelly

1985: 2 x DUP, 1 x UUP, 1 x SDLP, 1 x Sinn Féin
1989: 2 x DUP, 1 x UUP, 1 x SDLP, 1 x Alliance
1985-1989 Change: Alliance gain from Sinn Féin

Mourne

1985: 2 x SDLP, 1 x Sinn Féin, 1 x UUP, 1 x Independent Nationalist
1989: 2 x Independent Nationalist, 1 x SDLP, 1 x Sinn Féin, 1 x UUP
1985-1989 Change: Independent Nationalist leaves SDLP

References

Strabane District Council elections
Strabane